Unity Hall is a historic building located at 3140 S. Indiana Ave. in the Douglas community area of Chicago, Illinois. Built in 1887, the building originally served as a Jewish social club called the Lakeside Club. The red brick building, designed by local architect L.B. Dixon, features terra cotta decorations and sheet metal edging. In 1917, Chicago alderman Oscar Stanton De Priest founded the Peoples Movement Club and made Unity Hall its headquarters. De Priest was the first African-American to serve on the Chicago City Council, and he established the Peoples Movement Club to organize the black community politically. The Peoples Movement Club became "one of the best organized political groups" in Chicago's Black Metropolis neighborhood, and De Priest became the first African-American U.S. Representative from the northern states in 1928.

After the Peoples Movement Club left the building, William L. Dawson used it as his political headquarters. From the 1950s onward, the building had mainly been used by churches. It is currently vacant and was placed on Preservation Chicago's list of the most endangered historic properties in the city.

The building was added to the National Register of Historic Places on April 30, 1986. It was named a Chicago Landmark on September 9, 1998.

References

External links
Black Politics: Oscar Stanton De Priest and Unity Hall - Black History Heroes

African-American history in Chicago
Buildings and structures completed in 1887
Clubhouses on the National Register of Historic Places in Chicago
Chicago Landmarks
Douglas, Chicago